Yeruham Meshel (born 24 November 1912, died 27 November 2002) was an Israeli union leader and politician who served as head of the Histadrut from 1973 until 1984, and as a member of the Knesset for the Alignment between 1977 and 1984.

Biography
Born in Pinsk in the Russian Empire (today in Belarus), Meshel attended a religious primary school and a Hebrew high school. He was a member of Hashomer Hatzair, and made aliyah to Mandatory Palestine in 1933. He worked in the construction industry and was a member of Workers Councils.

Between 1940 and 1945 he was a representative for the Histadrut in British Army camps in Palestine. From 1950 until 1960 he was a member of the Histadrut's executive committee and chairman of the Industrial Workers Association. In 1970 he became chairman of the Trade Unions department and deputy secretary of the Histadrut, before becoming secretary general in 1973, a position he held until 1986. He also served as vice-president of Free Trade Union International.

A member of the Labor Party central committee, in 1977 Meshel was elected to the Knesset on the Alignment list (an alliance of Labor and Mapam). The following year he became head of the Pinhas Lavon Institute for Labor Movement Research, and in 1981 was re-elected. He lost his seat in the 1984 elections.

He died in 2002 at the age of 90.

References

External links

1912 births
2002 deaths
People from Pinsk
People from Pinsky Uyezd
Jews from the Russian Empire
Belarusian Jews
Jews in Mandatory Palestine
General Secretaries of Histadrut
Polish emigrants to Mandatory Palestine
Hashomer Hatzair members
Israeli people of Belarusian-Jewish descent
Israeli Labor Party politicians
Alignment (Israel) politicians
Members of the 9th Knesset (1977–1981)
Members of the 10th Knesset (1981–1984)
Burials at Nahalat Yitzhak Cemetery